Andrew Gonzales may refer to:
Andrew Gonzalez, Lasallian brother
Andrew Gonzales (drummer), known for drumming with the band Reel Big Fish
Andy González (baseball), baseball player